Bethlehem Voortrekker High School is a public co-education dual medium High School situated in Wesweg, Bethlehem, South Africa. Voortrekker High School was founded in 1870 by the Dutch Reformed Church. It was reopened in 1902 after the Anglo Boer War under the leadership of Dr George Clark.

History 

1936 - Voortekker becomes the first school to register its colors in the Schools Colors Register
1938 - The school receives its name Voortrekker High School
1940 - The school anthem is sung for the first time in October 1940
1979 - Move to the new School Building
2002 - Centenary celebrations

School anthem 

Omring van wydse koringvelde
Waar nog die Trekkerspore staan,
Sal ons sy daad en deug vermelde
Solank ons nuwe weë baan,
Roep uit bo somergroene velde
Roep uit met fier gespanne stem:
Ons roem die veels te min vermelde, 
ons roem die skool van Bethlehem.

Refrein:
Krag van hart en krag van gees,
Ons wil trou en suiwer wees:
Vreugde uit die hart gedra,
Krag van jong Suid-Afrika,
(Krag tot dade, krag herbore
tot die hoogste uitverkore)

Notable alumni 

P. W. Botha
Tom van Vollenhoven
Ntsopa Mokoena,  South Africa field hockey player

References

External links 
 

Schools in the Free State (province)
Educational institutions established in 1870
1870 establishments in the Orange Free State
Bilingual schools in South Africa